Marisa Abbondanzieri (born January 14, 1956 in Arcevia) is an Italian politician.

She began as an elementary school teacher. She was elected to the Italian Chamber of Deputies in 1999, succeeding Nilde Iotti and was reconfirmed as a representative in 2001 for the Democrats of the Left in the Marche. After that party was dissolved in 2007, she joined the Democratic Party.

She was a member of the Council of Europe from January 23, 2006 until September 22, 2006.

References

External links
Official site

1956 births
Living people
People from Arcevia
Democrats of the Left politicians
Democratic Party (Italy) politicians
Deputies of Legislature XIII of Italy
Deputies of Legislature XIV of Italy
21st-century Italian women politicians
20th-century Italian women
Women members of the Chamber of Deputies (Italy)